The Binghamton Triplets was a short-lived professional basketball team in the Continental Basketball Association. It began as one of six founding teams of the Eastern Professional Basketball League (EPBL) for the 1946-47 season. The teamed moved to Pottsville, Pennsylvania in the middle of its first season and changed its name to the Pottsville Packers for the 1947-48 season. The team moved again before the 1952-53 season to Wilkes-Barre, Pennsylvania to become the Wilkes-Barre Aces and folded after four games into the season.

For many years, there was also a minor league baseball team known as the Binghamton Triplets.

Season-by-season record

Continental Basketball Association teams
Basketball teams in New York (state)
Sports in Binghamton, New York
1946 establishments in New York (state)
Basketball teams established in 1946
Basketball teams disestablished in 1952
1952 disestablishments in New York (state)